Roger Federer won two Majors in 2009, the French Open, defeating Robin Söderling in the final, and Wimbledon, defeating Andy Roddick in the final. In addition, Federer made the two other Grand Slam finals, Australian Open losing to Rafael Nadal, and the US Open, losing to Juan Martín del Potro.  Federer went on to win two Master Series 1000 tournaments: in Madrid over Rafael Nadal, and in Cincinnati over Novak Djokovic. He lost in one 500 level event final in Basel to Djokovic.  During the year, Federer completed the Career Grand Slam by winning his first French Open title, and won a record fifteenth Grand Slam singles title, surpassing Pete Sampras's mark of fourteen.

Year summary

Early hard-court season
In preparation for the Australian Open, Federer played two exhibition tournaments and one official tournament. He lost to Murray in the semifinals of the Capitala World Tennis exhibition tournament in Abu Dhabi. He then lost in the semifinals of the ATP World Tour 250 series tournament in Doha, Qatar to Murray. Federer won the AAMI Classic exhibition in Melbourne, when he defeated Stanislas Wawrinka in the final.

Federer defeated each of his first three opponents in straight sets at the Australian Open. In the fourth round, Federer rallied from two sets down to defeat Tomáš Berdych. Federer reached his record 19th consecutive Grand Slam semifinal by defeating eighth-seeded Juan Martín del Potro in the quarterfinals in only 80 minutes. In his 18th Grand Slam final, Federer was defeated by long-time rival Nadal in their first meeting on a hard court in a Grand Slam tournament. The match lasted over four hours, with Nadal victorious in five sets. Federer broke down in tears during the trophy presentation and struggled to make his runner-up speech. Federer blamed the defeat on a lack of rhythm in his first serve.

Federer withdrew from the Barclays Dubai Tennis Championships and from Switzerland's Davis Cup tie against the U.S. because of a back injury he sustained in late 2008. He stated it was "a precautionary measure" to make sure his back is "fully rehabilitated ... for the rest of the 2009 season". On 4 March, Federer's agent, Tony Godsick, announced that the Australian tennis coach Darren Cahill was working with Federer on a trial basis at Federer's training base in Dubai. One week later, Cahill opted out of the coaching position, citing the travel commitment needed.

Federer played both of the ATP World Tour Masters 1000 tournaments in the United States. At the BNP Paribas Open in Indian Wells, California, Federer lost to Murray in the semifinals. At the Sony Ericsson Open in Key Biscayne, Florida, Federer defeated his first three opponents in straight sets, after receiving a first round bye. In the semifinals against Novak Djokovic, Federer lost a match that included Federer's smashing his racket in frustration after missing a forehand approach shot by hitting it into the net, which is the same shot that cost him the 2008 Wimbledon final.

Clay season and French Open titles
After initially deciding not to participate, Federer accepted a last-minute wildcard entry at the Monte-Carlo Rolex Masters, his first clay-court event of the year. He lost to Stanislas Wawrinka for the first time in the third round.

In the semifinals of the Internazionali BNL d'Italia in Rome, another ATP World Tour Masters 1000 series event on clay, Federer lost to Djokovic for the first time on clay.

Federer received a first-round bye in the Mutua Madrilena Madrid Open, the last ATP World Tour Masters 1000 series event on clay for the year. He defeated Nadal in the final. This ended Nadal's 33-match winning streak on clay, and for the second time Federer prevented Nadal from becoming the first man to win all three Masters Series on clay in the same year.

In the 2009 French Open, in a fourth-round encounter, Federer had to come back from two sets to love down to defeat Tommy Haas. He defeated Gaël Monfils in the quarterfinals to reach his 20th consecutive Grand Slam semifinal. He reached his fourth straight final in Paris by outlasting del Potro after coming back from 2–1 down. He won the French Open for the first time by beating Robin Söderling in the final. With this win, Federer equaled Pete Sampras's men's record of 14 Grand Slam titles and Ivan Lendl's record of 19 Grand Slam finals, and also became the sixth man in history to complete a Career Grand Slam. The call by Eurosport on match point was thus: "Federer wins the French Open for the first time in his career; and in addition must surely be regarded now as the greatest male player of all-time."

Owing to the overwhelming emotions and fatigue brought by the tournament, Federer withdrew from the Gerry Weber Open, his usual pre-Wimbledon tournament.

Grass season: Channel Slam, and smashing the all-time record

Federer became the highest seed for Wimbledon, after defending champion Nadal withdrew from the tournament due to tendinitis. Federer defeated Lu Yen-hsun in the first round. He moved safely into the third round with a win over Guillermo García-López. In the third round, Federer defeated Philipp Kohlschreiber. Federer then booked a place in the quarterfinals by defeating Söderling. In the quarterfinals, Federer cruised past Ivo Karlović, to extend his all-time record of consecutive Grand Slam semifinals to 21. In the semifinals, Federer defeated Tommy Haas to reach his seventh consecutive Wimbledon final, an all-time record. With this win, he also reached his 20th Grand Slam final, surpassing the previous record of 19 set by Lendl. In a match that took 4 hours and 17 minutes to complete, he beat Roddick in the final in the latest chapter of their long, though lopsided rivalry, regaining the world no. 1 spot from Rafael Nadal. The 30 total games in the fifth set was a new Grand Slam record. The match was also the longest men's singles final (in terms of games played) in Grand Slam history, with 77 games played, and the fifth set alone lasted 95 minutes. The match has been called an "instant classic" by ESPN, and received the highest TV ratings in the UK for any Wimbledon final since 2001. With the win, he also became the fourth man in the open era to win both the French Open and Wimbledon in the same year (the "Channel Slam"), following Nadal in 2008, Borg in 1978–1980, and Laver in 1969. He also joined Nadal as the only players to simultaneously hold Grand Slams on clay, grass, and hard court (2008 US Open, 2009 French Open, 2009 Wimbledon).

Summer hard-court season

Federer won his first match after a five-week break at the second round of the 2009 Rogers Cup against Frédéric Niemeyer following a first-round bye. He then defeated countryman Stanislas Wawrinka after coming back from three games down in the second set; in doing so, he made more history by contributing to the first occasion where the top 8 ranked men had all made the quarterfinals of a single tournament, joining the other seven players: Nadal, Murray, Djokovic, Roddick, del Potro, Jo-Wilfried Tsonga, and Davydenko. However, in the quarterfinals, he lost to Tsonga despite leading by four games in the final set.

Despite the relatively early exit in Montreal, Federer started off well at the 2009 Cincinnati Open, beating José Acasuso in the second round (after having another bye in the first round like the other top seeds) and David Ferrer in the third round. He then beat Lleyton Hewitt in the quarterfinals, followed by Murray in the semifinals to reach the final, where he defeated Novak Djokovic.

Federer began his US Open campaign well with a victory over unseeded Devin Britton. He advanced to the third round with a second-round win over Simon Greul. His third-round match was against Hewitt, against whom he lost his first set of the tournament, but eventually rallied to win the match. After this match, Federer held a 16–7 lead over Hewitt, continuing a fourteen match winning streak against him. Federer next defeated Tommy Robredo to book a quarterfinal berth against Robin Söderling for the third Grand Slam in a row, which he won in four sets after saving a set point in the fourth set. Federer reached his 21st Grand Slam final by defeating fourth seed Novak Djokovic for the third straight year. He triumphed and, in doing so, reached match point by performing a between-the-legs passing shot, which he later described as "...the greatest shot I ever hit in my life." He lost to del Potro in the final in five sets. The loss broke Federer's streak of forty consecutive wins at the US Open. It also marked the first time Federer had lost in a Grand Slam final to an opponent other than Rafael Nadal.

Fall indoor season
Federer went on to play in the Davis Cup tie with Italy, and in his first match on the red clay courts at Valletta Cambiaso Club, in Genoa, won in a match against Simone Bolelli. He sealed Switzerland's qualification for the World Group with a victory over Potito Starace. Following the match, Federer was quoted as saying "I was able to play very well. I have to go on holiday badly. I have a problem with my leg, I have a problem with my arm – everything is hurting. And I've got to do some baby-sitting." He later withdrew from the 2009 Japan Open and the Shanghai ATP Masters 1000.

At the Davidoff Swiss Indoors, Federer defeated Olivier Rochus, Andreas Seppi, Evgeny Korolev, and his childhood friend Marco Chiudinelli in straight sets, before losing in the finals to Novak Djokovic.

Federer's next tournament was the Paris Masters, where his six previous appearances had never extended past the quarterfinals. After a first-round bye, Federer continued his Paris Open struggles with an early exit to second-round opponent Julien Benneteau.

Federer's final tournament of the year was the 2009 ATP World Tour Finals. He beat Fernando Verdasco in the first of his round-robin matches, followed by a victory over Andy Murray, which secured him the year-end no. 1 ranking for the fifth year. However, he lost to del Potro once more, but he won enough games to qualify for the semifinals. In the semifinals, he met Nikolay Davydenko, who beat Federer for the first time in their 13 encounters. This loss ended Roger Federer's 2009 tennis season.

The year saw Federer accomplishing three major goals: winning his first French Open title, breaking Pete Sampras's record of 14 Grand Slam wins, and regaining the no. 1 ranking from Rafael Nadal.

Matches

Grand Slam tournament performance

All matches

Singles

Exhibition matches

Doubles

Yearly records

Finals

Singles: 7 (4–3)

See also
Roger Federer
Roger Federer career statistics

References

External links
  
 ATP tour profile

2009
Federer season
2009 in Swiss tennis
2009 in Swiss sport